Jefferson Yuri de Sousa Matias (born 10 February 1995) is a Brazilian professional footballer who plays as a centre-back for Liga I club CFR Cluj.

Career
Born in Campina Grande, Brazil, Matias joined Académica de Coimbra on 27 June 2016 on a one-year loan. He made his debut on 30 July 2016, in an away draw against Gil Vicente F.C.

On 3 April 2017, he signed a permanent deal to stay at Académica.

In January 2020, Académica terminated his contract on mutual consent and Yuri signed a six month deal with Persian Gulf Pro League side Tractor S.C.

Honours

CFR Cluj
Liga I: 2021–22
Supercupa României runner-up: 2022

References

External links

1995 births
Living people
Brazilian footballers
Association football defenders
Liga Portugal 2 players
América Futebol Clube (PE) players
Associação Académica de Coimbra – O.A.F. players
Persian Gulf Pro League players
Tractor S.C. players
CS Gaz Metan Mediaș players
CFR Cluj players
Liga I players
Brazilian expatriate footballers
Brazilian expatriate sportspeople in Portugal
Brazilian expatriate sportspeople in Romania
Expatriate footballers in Iran
Expatriate footballers in Portugal
Expatriate footballers in Romania